Spomenka Štimec (born 4 January 1949) is a Croatian writer who is an acclaimed contemporary writer in Esperanto, and also significant to Esperanto in Croatia. In 1994 she shared the cultural award Alena Esperanto-Kulturpremio with the magazine Heroldo de Esperanto.

References 

1949 births
Living people
Croatian Esperantists
Writers of Esperanto literature